This is a list of 268 species in Leptogaster, a genus of robber flies in the family Asilidae.

Leptogaster species

 Leptogaster abdominalis Hsia, 1949 c g
 Leptogaster acanthozona Janssens, 1954 c g
 Leptogaster aegra Martin, 1957 i c g
 Leptogaster aestiva White, 1914 c g
 Leptogaster affinis Lehr, 1972 c g
 Leptogaster aganniphe Janssens, 1957 c g
 Leptogaster albimana Walker, 1858 c g
 Leptogaster albitarsis (Macquart, 1846) c g
 Leptogaster altacola Martin, 1957 i c g
 Leptogaster angelus Osten Sacken, 1881 c g
 Leptogaster angustilineola Martin, 1964 c g
 Leptogaster annulipes Walker, 1855 c g
 Leptogaster antennalis Janssens, 1954 c g
 Leptogaster antenorea (Lioy, 1864) c g
 Leptogaster antipoda Bigot, 1878 c g
 Leptogaster antiquaria Martin, 1964 c g
 Leptogaster apicalis Enderlein, 1914 c g
 Leptogaster appendiculata Hermann, 1917 c g
 Leptogaster arborcola Martin, 1957 i c g
 Leptogaster arenicola (James, 1937) i c g
 Leptogaster argentinae Martin, 1972 c g
 Leptogaster argionina Speiser, 1910 c g
 Leptogaster arida (Cole, 1919) i c g
 Leptogaster aristalis Janssens, 1957 c g
 Leptogaster armeniaca Paramonov, 1930 c g
 Leptogaster atridorsalis Back, 1909 i c g
 Leptogaster augusta Hsia, 1949 c g
 Leptogaster auripulverella Seguy, 1934 c g
 Leptogaster australis Ricardo, 1912 c g
 Leptogaster autumnalis White, 1916 c g
 Leptogaster bahamiensis Scarbrough, 1996 c g
 Leptogaster bancrofti Ricardo, 1912 c g
 Leptogaster basalis Walker, 1855 c g
 Leptogaster basilaris Coquillett, 1898 c g
 Leptogaster basilewskyi Janssens, 1955 c g
 Leptogaster bengryi Farr, 1963 c g
 Leptogaster biannulata Martin, 1964 c g
 Leptogaster bicolor (Macquart, 1848) c
 Leptogaster bicoloripes Hsia, 1949 c g
 Leptogaster bilobata Hermann, 1917 c g
 Leptogaster bivittata Lehr, 1975 c g
 Leptogaster brevicornis Loew, 1872 i c g b
 Leptogaster brevitarsis Hardy, 1935 c g
 Leptogaster breviventris Theodor, 1980 c g
 Leptogaster brunnea Loew, 1858 c g
 Leptogaster calceata Engel, 1925 c g
 Leptogaster californica Martin, 1957 i c g
 Leptogaster calvimacula Martin, 1964 c g
 Leptogaster candidata Seguy, 1930 c g
 Leptogaster canuta Martin, 1964 c g
 Leptogaster carolinensis Schiner, 1866 i c g
 Leptogaster carotenoides Tomasovic, 1999 c g
 Leptogaster cheriani Bromley, 1938 c g
 Leptogaster cilipes Frey, 1937 c g
 Leptogaster cingulipes Walker, 1849 c g
 Leptogaster clavistyla (Rondani, 1848) c g
 Leptogaster coarctata Hermann, 1917 c g
 Leptogaster collata Martin, 1964 c g
 Leptogaster coloradensis James, 1937 i c g
 Leptogaster concava Martin, 1964 c g
 Leptogaster concinnata Williston, 1901 c g
 Leptogaster coniata Oldroyd, 1960 c g
 Leptogaster contermina Edwards, 1919 c g
 Leptogaster convergens Frey, 1937 c g
 Leptogaster cracens Martins, 1964 c g
 Leptogaster crassipes Hsia, 1949 c g
 Leptogaster crassitarsis Frey, 1937 c g
 Leptogaster cressoni Bromley, 1942 c g
 Leptogaster crocea Williston, 1901 c g
 Leptogaster crockeri Curran, 1936 c g
 Leptogaster cultaventris Martin, 1957 i c g
 Leptogaster curvivena Hsia, 1949 c g
 Leptogaster cylindrica (De Geer, 1776) c g
 Leptogaster dalmatina Engel, 1925 c g
 Leptogaster dasyphlebia Martin, 1964 c g
 Leptogaster decellei Oldroyd, 1968 c g
 Leptogaster diluta Martin, 1964 c g
 Leptogaster dissimilis Ricardo, 1912 c g
 Leptogaster distincta Schiner, 1867 c g
 Leptogaster doleschalli Oldroyd, 1975 c g
 Leptogaster dorospicta Hsia, 1949 c g
 Leptogaster dorsalis Williston, 1901 c g
 Leptogaster ealensis Janssens, 1954 c g
 Leptogaster elbaiensis Efflatoun, 1937 c g
 Leptogaster elongata Martin, 1964 c g
 Leptogaster entebbensis Oldroyd, 1939 c g
 Leptogaster eoa Lehr, 1961 c g
 Leptogaster eudicrana Loew, 1874 i c g
 Leptogaster evanescens Janssens, 1954 c g
 Leptogaster exacta Walker, 1862 c g
 Leptogaster faragi Efflatoun, 1937 c g
 Leptogaster ferrugineus Walker, 1855 c g
 Leptogaster fervens Wiedemann, 1830 c g
 Leptogaster filiventris Hsia, 1949 c g
 Leptogaster flavipes Loew, 1862 i c g b
 Leptogaster flaviventris Hsia, 1949 c g
 Leptogaster flavobrunnea Hull, 1967 c g
 Leptogaster formosana Enderlein, 1914 c g
 Leptogaster fornicata Martin, 1957 i c g
 Leptogaster freyi Bromley, 1951 c g
 Leptogaster fulvicrus Hsia, 1949 c g
 Leptogaster fulvipes Bigot, 1878 c g
 Leptogaster fumipennis Loew, 1871 c g
 Leptogaster fumosa Janssens, 1954 c g
 Leptogaster furculata Hsia, 1949 c g
 Leptogaster fuscatipennis Frey, 1937 c g
 Leptogaster fuscifacies Martin, 1964 c g
 Leptogaster fuscipennis Blanchard, 1852 c g
 Leptogaster galbicesta Martin, 1964 c g
 Leptogaster geniculata (Macquart, 1850) c g
 Leptogaster globopyga Hull, 1967 c g
 Leptogaster gracilipes Hsia, 1949 c g
 Leptogaster gracilis Loew, 1847 c g
 Leptogaster guttiventris Zetterstedt, 1842 c g
 Leptogaster habilis Wulp, 1872 c g
 Leptogaster helvola Loew, 1871 c g
 Leptogaster hermelina Janssens, 1954 c g
 Leptogaster hermonensis Theodor, 1980 c g
 Leptogaster hesperis Martin, 1957 i c g
 Leptogaster hirticollis Wulp, 1872 c g
 Leptogaster hirtipes Coquillett, 1904 i c g
 Leptogaster hispanica Meigen, 1838 c g
 Leptogaster hopehensis Hsia, 1949 c g
 Leptogaster hyacinthina Scarbrough, 1996 c g
 Leptogaster incisuralis Loew, 1862 i c g
 Leptogaster inflatus Osten Sacken, 1881 c g
 Leptogaster insularis Janssens, 1954 c g
 Leptogaster intima Williston, 1901 c g
 Leptogaster inutilis Walker, 1856 c g
 Leptogaster javanensis Meijere, 1914 c g
 Leptogaster judaica Janssens, 1969 c g
 Leptogaster kamerlacheri Schiner, 1867 c g
 Leptogaster kashgarica Paramonov, 1930 c g
 Leptogaster keiseri Martin, 1964 c g
 Leptogaster koshunensis Oldroyd, 1975 c g
 Leptogaster krada Oldroyd, 1960 c g
 Leptogaster lambertoni Bromley, 1942 c g
 Leptogaster lanata Martin, 1957 i c g
 Leptogaster laoshanensis Hsia, 1949 c g
 Leptogaster latestriata Becker, 1906 c g
 Leptogaster lehri Hradsky & Huttinger, 1983 c g
 Leptogaster lerneri Curran, 1953 i c g
 Leptogaster levis Wulp, 1872 c g
 Leptogaster levusara Evenhuis, 2006 c g
 Leptogaster linearis Becker, 1906 c g
 Leptogaster lineatus Scarbrough, 1996 c g
 Leptogaster loaloa Evenhuis, 2006 c g
 Leptogaster logicaudu Hermann, 1917 g
 Leptogaster longicauda Hermann, 1917 c g
 Leptogaster longicrinita Martin, 1964 c g
 Leptogaster longifurcata Meijere, 1914 c g
 Leptogaster longipes Walker, 1858 c g
 Leptogaster longitibialis Efflatoun, 1937 c g
 Leptogaster ludens Curran, 1927 c g
 Leptogaster macedo Janssens, 1959 c g
 Leptogaster macilenta Wulp, 1872 c g
 Leptogaster maculipennis Janssens, 1957 c g
 Leptogaster madagascriensis Frey, 1937 c g
 Leptogaster magnicollis Walker, 1862 c g
 Leptogaster martini Farr, 1963 c g
 Leptogaster masaica Lindner, 1955 c g
 Leptogaster medicesta Martin, 1964 c g
 Leptogaster megafemur Hull, 1967 c g
 Leptogaster melanomystax Janssens, 1954 c g
 Leptogaster meriel Evenhuis, 2006 c g
 Leptogaster micropygialis Williston, 1901 c g
 Leptogaster moluccana (Doleschall, 1857) c g
 Leptogaster montana Theodor, 1980 c g
 Leptogaster multicincta Walker, 1851 c g
 Leptogaster munda Walker, 1859 c g
 Leptogaster murina Loew, 1862 i c g b
 Leptogaster nartshukae Lehr, 1961 c g
 Leptogaster nememusha Speiser, 1910 c g
 Leptogaster nerophana Oldroyd, 1960 c g
 Leptogaster niger Wiedemann, 1828 c g
 Leptogaster nigra Hsia, 1949 c g
 Leptogaster nitens Bromley, 1947 c g
 Leptogaster nitida Macquart, 1826 c g
 Leptogaster nitoris Martin, 1957 i c g
 Leptogaster nubeculosa Bigot, 1878 c g
 Leptogaster obscuripennis Johnson, 1895 i c g
 Leptogaster obscuripes Loew, 1862 i c g
 Leptogaster occidentalis White, 1914 c g
 Leptogaster occlusa Meijere, 1914 c g
 Leptogaster ochricornis Loew, 1858 c g
 Leptogaster odostata Oldroyd, 1960 c g
 Leptogaster ophionea Frey, 1937 c g
 Leptogaster pachypygialis Engel, 1925 c g
 Leptogaster pacifica Bezzi, 1928 c g
 Leptogaster palawanensis Oldroyd, 1972 c g
 Leptogaster pallipes Roser, 1840 c g
 Leptogaster palparis Loew, 1847 c g
 Leptogaster panda Martin, 1957 i c g
 Leptogaster parvoclava Martin, 1957 i c g
 Leptogaster patula Martin, 1957 i c g
 Leptogaster pedania Walker, 1849 c g
 Leptogaster pedunculata Loew, 1847 c g
 Leptogaster pellucida Janssens, 1954 c g
 Leptogaster penicillata Janssens, 1954 c g
 Leptogaster petiola Martin, 1964 c g
 Leptogaster pictipennis Loew, 1858 c g
 Leptogaster pilosella Hermann, 1917 c g
 Leptogaster plebeja Janssens, 1957 c g
 Leptogaster plilcnemis Janssens, 1954 c g
 Leptogaster princeps Osten Sacken, 1882 c g
 Leptogaster pubescens Curran, 1934 c g
 Leptogaster pubicornis Loew, 1847 c g
 Leptogaster puella Janssens, 1953 c g
 Leptogaster pumila (Macquart, 1834) c g
 Leptogaster pusilla Jaennicke, 1867 c g
 Leptogaster pyragra Janssens, 1957 c g
 Leptogaster radialis Janssens, 1954 c g
 Leptogaster recurva Martin, 1964 c g
 Leptogaster roederi  Williston, 1896
 Leptogaster rubida Wiedemann, 1821 c g
 Leptogaster rufa Janssens, 1953 c g
 Leptogaster ruficesta Martin, 1964 c g
 Leptogaster rufirostris Loew, 1858 c g
 Leptogaster rufithorax Meijere, 1913 c g
 Leptogaster salina Lehr, 1972 c g
 Leptogaster salvia Martin, 1957 i c g
 Leptogaster schaefferi Back, 1909 i c g
 Leptogaster schoutedeni Janssens, 1954 c g
 Leptogaster sericea Janssens, 1954 c g
 Leptogaster seyrigi Janssens, 1954 c g
 Leptogaster signata Meijere, 1914 c g
 Leptogaster similis Hsia, 1949 c g
 Leptogaster sinensis Hsia, 1949 c g
 Leptogaster spadix Hsia, 1949 c g
 Leptogaster spinitarsis Bromely, 1951 c g
 Leptogaster spinulosa Meijere, 1914 c g
 Leptogaster stackelbergi Lehr, 1961 c g
 Leptogaster stichosoma Janssens, 1957 c g
 Leptogaster straminea Becker, 1906 c g
 Leptogaster subtilis Loew, 1847 c g
 Leptogaster suleymani Hasbenli, 2006 c g
 Leptogaster tarsalis Janssens, 1954 c g
 Leptogaster taurica Lehr, 1961 c g
 Leptogaster tenerrima Meijere, 1914 c g
 Leptogaster tenuis Loew, 1858 c g
 Leptogaster tesquorum Lehr, 1961 c g
 Leptogaster texana Bromley, 1934 i c g
 Leptogaster tillyardi Hardy, 1935 c g
 Leptogaster titanus Carrera, 1958 c g
 Leptogaster tomentosa Theodor, 1980 c g
 Leptogaster tornowii Brethes, 1904 c g
 Leptogaster triangulata Williston, 1901 c g
 Leptogaster tricolor Walker, 1856 c g
 Leptogaster trifasciata Meijere, 1914 c g
 Leptogaster trimaculata Meijere, 1914 c g
 Leptogaster trimucronotata Hermann, 1917 c g
 Leptogaster tropica Curran, 1934 c g
 Leptogaster truncata Theodor, 1980 c g
 Leptogaster turkmenica Paramonov, 1930 c g
 Leptogaster ungula Martin, 1964 c g
 Leptogaster unicolor (Doleschall, 1858) c g
 Leptogaster unihammata Hermann, 1917 c g
 Leptogaster upembana Janssens, 1954 c g
 Leptogaster urundiana Janssens, 1953 c g
 Leptogaster varipes Wulp, 1880 c g
 Leptogaster velutina Janssens, 1954 c g
 Leptogaster venustus Bromely, 1929 c g
 Leptogaster vernalis White, 1914 c g
 Leptogaster virgata Coquillett, 1904 i c g b
 Leptogaster vitiensis Evenhuis, 2006 c g
 Leptogaster vitripennis Schiner, 1867 c g
 Leptogaster vorax Curran, 1934 c g
 Leptogaster whitei Hardy, 1940 c g

Data sources: i = ITIS, c = Catalogue of Life, g = GBIF, b = Bugguide.net

References

Leptogaster
Articles created by Qbugbot